The Kawanishi J3K (long designation: Navy Kawanishi 17-shi Interceptor fighter Otsu (B)) was an interceptor fighter developed by the Japanese company Kawanishi Kōkūki KK in the early 1940s. A further development was the Kawanishi J6K.

Design and development
The J3K was developed in parallel to the Kawanishi N1K-J Shiden but was abandoned in the early stages of development.

Specifications

See also

References

1940s Japanese fighter aircraft
World War II Japanese fighter aircraft
J3K
Single-engined tractor aircraft
Mid-wing aircraft